For the results of the Solomon Islands national football team, see:

Solomon Islands national football team results (1963–1999)
Solomon Islands national football team results (2000–2019)